Shakalaka may refer to:

Music
 “Boom shaka-laka-laka", a lyric from "I Want to Take You Higher”, 1969 funk blues song by Sly and The Family Stone
 "Boom Shaka Laka", 1970 reggae song by Hopeton Lewis, also covered by UB40 on the 2010 album Labour of Love IV
 "Boom Shack-A-Lak", 1993 song by Apache Indian
 "Boom Shakalaka", a chanting musical number from 1996 film Muppet Treasure Island 
 "Shakalaka Baby", 2002 song from film Nayaka
 "Boom Shacka", 2010 song by Brianna and Flo Rida
 "Boom shaka-laka", lyric from the 2012 Big Bang song "Fantastic Baby"
 "Boom Shakalaka", 2017 Psy-Trance song by the Japanese DJ lapix released in the compilation album Bizarre Nation under the label Massive CircleZ
 "Shakalaka", 2018 original mix by Steve Aoki, Deorro, MAKJ & Max Styler
 "BoomShakalaka" 2013 original song of Bushwaka
"Boomshakalaka", a 2019 song by Dimitri Vegas & Like Mike

Other uses
 Shaka Laka Boom Boom, 2002 children's television series
 Shakalaka Baby (film), 2002 Tamil film directed by Rama Narayanan
 Shakalaka Boom Boom, 2007 Indian thriller drama film directed by Suneel Darshan 
 "Boom-shaka-laka," exclamation used by the announcer in the basketball video game NBA Jam
 "Boom-shaka-laka," exclamation used by the pig tribe in Muppet Treasure Island

See also 
 Chakalaka